Laura Lee Huttenbach is an author and athlete from Atlanta, Georgia. In 2001, the Georgia House of Representatives honored her with a resolution. Georgia House Resolution 586 commended her for her athleticism, academics, and community service.

Prior to the 1996 Olympics in Atlanta, she was nominated as a "community hero" and received the honor of carrying the Olympic Torch as it passed through the city of Atlanta. A list of Georgia runners was documented in Savannah Now. That flame was later passed to Muhammad Ali, the highlight of the opening ceremony of the 1996 Atlanta Olympics.

Career
Huttenbach gained notoriety as an athlete in the State of Georgia. She played soccer, volleyball, basketball and cross country. Her honors included Georgia WIN Female Athlete of the year; 5AAA Volleyball 6 Player of the Year; All State Volleyball Team; Georgia Women's Intersport Female Athlete 7 of the Year; Four year Varsity Starter and Senior Team Captain for Volleyball; Four year 8 starter and Senior Team Captain for Soccer Team; Atlanta Journal/Constitution All-Area 9 Soccer Team; All state Honorable Mention Soccer Team; Atlanta Journal/Constitution 10 All-Area Basketball Team. For all these accomplishments, she was named in the Riverwood High School Athletic Hall of Fame Inaugural Class.

A graduate of the University of Virginia, she went on to travel the world. She spent a year in Brazil teaching English and is fluent in Portuguese and Spanish. For a year, she backpacked from South Africa to Egypt, relying mostly on public transpiration to travel between countries. The people she met on her journeys inspired her to write. Her first publication was a chapter in the book The Best Travel Writing 2010: True Stories from Around the World.
While in Kenya, she met a 90 year old community leader who had a former life as a General in the Mau Mau rebellion. She later returned to Kenya to document his life. Her first book was The Boy is Gone: Conversations with a Mau Mau General published by Ohio University Press.
She was interviewed on Jeff Koinange Live in December 2015 on KTN News Kenya. The segment was broadcast live and over the air, viewed by thousands in Kenya; the segment made her a minor celebrity in that country. Her unique academic stance has inspired on ongoing discourse on African history and its view on the world stage.

She later moved to South Beach, Miami, Florida, where she met local streak running legend Robert "The Raven" Kraft. Each and every day for the past 40 years, he has led a community of runners over eight miles of sand a day. Inspired by his life and dedication, she wrote Running with Raven: The Amazing Story of One Man, His Passion, and the Community He Inspired. Its release date was April 25, 2017, through Kensington Press. It is listed as a "#1 New Release" on Amazon.com in Sports Essays and is receiving positive reviews.

References

External links 
 

21st-century American women writers
Year of birth missing (living people)
Living people
Writers from Atlanta
Sportspeople from Atlanta
University of Virginia alumni